Monroe City is a town in Harrison Township, Knox County, Indiana, United States. The population was 545 at the 2010 census.

Monroe City was named for one of its founders, Monroe Alton.

Geography
Monroe City is located at  (38.615891, -87.355232).

Demographics

2010 census
As of the census of 2010, there were 545 people, 217 households, and 153 families living in the town. The racial makeup of the town was 98.7% White, 0.6% African American, 0.2% Native American, and 0.6% from other races. Hispanic or Latino of any race were 0.7% of the population.

There were 217 households, of which 37.8% had children under the age of 18 living with them, 53.0% were married couples living together, 14.3% had a female householder with no husband present, 3.2% had a male householder with no wife present, and 29.5% were non-families. 29.0% of all households were made up of individuals, and 13.8% had someone living alone who was 65 years of age or older. The average household size was 2.51 and the average family size was 3.08.

The median age in the town was 32.8 years. 28.8% of residents were under the age of 18; 8.2% were between the ages of 18 and 24; 29% were from 25 to 44; 20.7% were from 45 to 64; and 13.2% were 65 years of age or older. The gender makeup of the town was 47.3% male and 52.7% female.

2000 census
As of the census of 2000, there were 548 people, 231 households, and 157 families living in the town. The racial makeup of the town was 99.27% White, 0.18% African American, and 0.55% from two or more races. Hispanic or Latino of any race were 0.36% of the population.

There were 231 households, out of which 32.9% had children under the age of 18 living with them, 53.7% were married couples living together, 11.3% had a female householder with no husband present, and 32.0% were non-families. 31.2% of all households were made up of individuals, and 16.9% had someone living alone who was 65 years of age or older. The average household size was 2.36 and the average family size was 2.94.

In the town, the population was spread out, with 24.6% under the age of 18, 8.4% from 18 to 24, 26.8% from 25 to 44, 22.6% from 45 to 64, and 17.5% who were 65 years of age or older. The median age was 39 years. For every 100 females, there were 93.6 males. For every 100 females age 18 and over, there were 90.3 males.

The median income for a household in the town was $32,788, and the median income for a family was $43,125. Males had a median income of $31,364 versus $18,269 for females. The per capita income for the town was $15,579. About 7.2% of families and 7.1% of the population were below the poverty line, including 9.0% of those under age 18 and 2.0% of those age 65 or over.

References

Communities of Southwestern Indiana
Towns in Knox County, Indiana
Towns in Indiana